Five Thousand Stadium, also known as Al-Hussein Stadium, is a football-specific stadium in Baghdad, Iraq. It is currently used mostly for football matches and is the home stadium of Al-Hussein SC. As the stadium's name implies, it can hold 5,000 spectators.

See also 
List of football stadiums in Iraq

References

Football venues in Iraq
Buildings and structures in Baghdad
Sport in Baghdad